William Stoughton may refer to:

 William Stoughton (judge) (1631–1701), judge in charge of the Salem witch trials
 William Stoughton (English constitutionalist) (fl. 1585), a member of parliament who promoted classical republicanism
 William L. Stoughton (1827–1888), American politician from the state of Michigan

See also
 William Staughton (died 1829), Baptist clergyman